Joseph Raleigh Bryson (January 18, 1893 – March 10, 1953) was a U.S. Representative from South Carolina.

Born in Brevard, North Carolina, Bryson moved, with his parents, to Greenville, South Carolina, in 1900.
He attended the public schools.
He graduated from Furman University, Greenville, South Carolina, in 1917 and with a law degree from the University of South Carolina at Columbia in 1920.
Enlisted on September 28, 1915, as a private in Company A, First Infantry, South Carolina National Guard, and served until discharged on August 9, 1916.
Bryson reenlisted on August 3, 1917, in the Medical Reserve Corps, and was discharged as a second lieutenant of Infantry on December 12, 1918.
He was admitted to the bar in 1920 and commenced practice in Greenville, South Carolina.
He served as member of the State house of representatives 1921-1924.
He served in the State senate 1929-1932.

Bryson was elected as a Democrat to the Seventy-sixth and to the seven succeeding Congresses, and served from January 3, 1939, until his death from cerebral hemorrhage at the Bethesda Naval Hospital in Bethesda, Maryland, March 10, 1953.
He was interred in Woodlawn Memorial Park, Greenville, South Carolina.

See also
 List of United States Congress members who died in office (1950–99)

References

Sources

The Joseph R. Bryson Papers, 1917-1953 at South Carolina Political Collections (University of South Carolina)
 Memorial services held in the House of Representatives together with remarks presented in eulogy of Joseph Raleigh Bryson, late a representative from South Carolina

1893 births
1953 deaths
United States Army officers
Democratic Party members of the United States House of Representatives from South Carolina
20th-century American politicians
University of South Carolina alumni